Kim E. Schatzel is an American academic administrator who is the 19th president of the University of Louisville. She joined Eastern Michigan University in January 2012 as provost and executive vice president of academic and student affairs, and became interim president on July 8, 2015, following the resignation of Susan Martin. Schatzel was previously dean of the college of business at University of Michigan–Dearborn. On November 30, 2022 she was announced as the next president of University of Louisville and began her tenure on February 1, 2023.

Corporate career
Schatzel spent more than 20 years working in new ventures and start-up ventures. She began her career working as a foreperson at a Ford Pinto manufacturing plant. Her roles later ranged from being a top-level manager of an automobile parts manufacturer to serving as CEO of ICM/Krebsoge.

She was appointed to the board of directors of Health Alliance Plan in February 2013 and is chair of its audit committee as well as the audit and finance committee for Henry Ford Health System.

Academic career
Schatzel was an assistant professor at Boston College from 1999 until she started working at University of Michigan–Dearborn in 2000 as an assistant professor of marketing. She held numerous positions until becoming dean of the college of business in 2008.

She was also a professor of marketing at the University of Michigan's Ross School of Business, and received the university's Distinguished Faculty Teaching Award in 2006.

On January 3, 2012, she started at Eastern Michigan University as provost and executive vice president of academic and student affairs.

On July 8, 2015, Schatzel became interim president, following the resignation of the previous president, Susan Martin. She retained her position as provost while serving as the interim. On December 4, 2015, Towson University selected her as their next president; her last day was January 7, 2016. She began her tenure on January 25, 2016.

Her research and teaching focuses on product innovation, new product introductions, and marketing communications.

Personal life
Schatzel received a bachelor of science degree in economics and biology from Washington University in St. Louis in 1978. She received a doctorate in business administration from Michigan State University's Eli Broad Graduate School of Management in 1999.

She lives with her husband, Trevor Iles, an entrepreneur and business owner, and has two children.

References

External links
 Biography – Towson University

Presidents of Towson University
American women chief executives
Living people
Michigan State University alumni
People from Ypsilanti, Michigan
Presidents of Eastern Michigan University
Ross School of Business faculty
University of Michigan–Dearborn people
Washington University in St. Louis alumni
Date of birth missing (living people)
Women heads of universities and colleges
Year of birth missing (living people)